The 1984 SWAC men's basketball tournament was held March 7–9, 1984. The quarterfinal round was held at the home arena of the higher-seeded team, while the semifinal and championship rounds were held at the Mississippi Coliseum in Jackson, Mississippi. Alcorn State defeated , 78–69 in the championship game. The Braves received the conference's automatic bid to the 1999 NCAA tournament as one of two No. 12 seeds in the Midwest Region.

Bracket and results

References

1983–84 Southwestern Athletic Conference men's basketball season
SWAC men's basketball tournament